Arthur Thorpe may refer to:
 Arthur Thorpe (footballer)
 Arthur Thorpe (physicist)